is the second largest island in the Koshikijima Islands. Its coasts are washed by East China Sea.

Settlements and administrative units 

Kamikoshiki, Kagoshima

Geography
The island's mountains are generally raising directly from the sea, with the very small coastal plains. Terrain is rugged, although not to the same degree as on nearby Shimokoshiki-jima. The north-eastern coast features a 5-km long sandspit enclosing three shallow lagoons. The population is concentrated in extreme east of island in the  placed on low sandspit 1400 by 250 metres large, being the largest settlement of Japan ever built on the sandspit.

History
The island was inhabited from the Jōmon period and have an important archaeological sites. It was inhabited by Satsuma Hayato people during Nara period. The first Japanese fortifications on island were built during Jōkyū War in 1221.  The island was belonging to Christian domain during Nanboku trade period and islanders has participated in the Shimabara rebellion of 1638. The Kamikoshiki-jima has suffered from the same string of epidemics, famine and typhoon-related damage as nearby Shimokoshiki-jima in 19th and 20th centuries, resulting in significant emigration and population decline which peaked at 11166 men in 1950.

Transportation
Kamikoshiki-jima is connected to Nakakoshiki-jima and  Shimokoshiki-jima by a bridge and two connecting tunnels, which were completed on 29 August 2020 after more than 9 years of construction. Ferry lines connect Kamikoshiki-jima to Shimokoshiki-jima and Ichikikushikino, a city on the Kyushu mainland. The ferry offers two daily round-trip routes.

Inland, transportation is provided by public buses operating along four routes.

See also
Shimokoshiki-jima
Koshikijima Islands

External links
 Detailed map of Kami-Koshiki-jima

References
This article incorporates material from Japanese Wikipedia page 上甑島, accessed 31 August 2017

Islands of Kagoshima Prefecture
Islands of the East China Sea